Cinema of Turkey or Turkish cinema (also old known as Yeşilçam literally means The Green Pine in Turkish language), or Türk sineması is the sobriquet that refers to the Turkish film art and industry. It is an important part of Turkish culture, and has flourished over the years, delivering entertainment to audiences in Turkey, Turkish expatriates across Europe, Balkans & Eastern Europe, also more recently prospering in the Arab world and to a lesser extent, the rest of the world.

The first film exhibited in the Ottoman Empire was the Lumière Brothers' 1895 film, L'Arrivée d'un train en gare de La Ciotat, which was shown in Istanbul in 1896. The Weavers (1905), by the Manaki brothers, was the first film made in the Ottoman Empire. 

The earliest surviving film made in what is present-day Turkey was a documentary entitled Ayastefanos'taki Rus Abidesinin Yıkılışı (Demolition of the Russian Monument at San Stefano), directed by Fuat Uzkınay and completed in 1914. The first narrative film, Sedat Simavi's The Spy, was released in 1917. Turkey's first sound film was shown in 1931.

History

Overview
In terms of film production, Turkey shared the same fate with many of the national cinemas of the 20th century. Film production wasn't continuous until around the 1950s and the film market in general was run by a few major import companies that struggled for domination in the most population-dense and profitable cities such as Istanbul and İzmir. Film theatres rarely ever screened any locally produced films and the majority of the programs consisted of films of the stronger western film industries, especially those of the United States, France, Italy and Germany. Attempts at film production came primarily from multinational studios, which could rely on their comprehensive distribution networks together with their own theatre chains, thus guaranteeing them a return on their investment. Between the years 1896–1945, the number of locally produced films did not even reach 50 films in total, equal to less than a single year's annual film production in the 1950s and 1960s. Domestically produced films constituted only a small fraction of the total number of films screened in Turkey prior to the 1950s.

Film production in Turkey increased drastically after World War II. With a total of 49 films produced in 1952, this single year equaled a greater output produced in Turkey than all previous years combined. During the 1960s, Turkey became the fifth biggest film producer worldwide as annual film production reached the 300 film benchmark just at the beginning of the 1970s. Compared to other national cinemas, the achievements of the Turkish film industry after 1950 are still remarkable.

During the 1970s, the impact of TV and video as the new popular forms of media and political turmoil (often hand in hand with deep economic crises) caused a sharp drop in ticket sales, resulting in a steady decline starting around 1980 and continuing until the mid-1990s. The number of annual ticket sales decreased from a peak of 90 million tickets in 1966 to 56 million tickets in 1984 and only 11 million in 1990. Accordingly, the number of film theatres declined from approximately 2,000 in 1966 to 854 in 1984 and 290 in 1990. During the 1990s the average number of films produced per year remained between 10-15; usually half of them not even making it into the theatres.

Since 1995 the situation has improved. After the year 2000, annual ticket sales rose to 20 million and since 1995, the number of theatres has steadily increased to approximately 500 nationwide. Currently, Turkish films attract audiences of millions of viewers and routinely top the blockbuster lists, often surpassing foreign films at the box office. However, it is difficult to speak about the existence of an industry, since most films are rather individual projects of directors who otherwise earn their living in television, advertising or theatre. The distribution of these films are mainly handled by multinational corporations such as Warner Bros. and United International Pictures.

Pre-1950s
Most of the Turkish films produced before 1950 were projects initiated by import companies owned by local families, most notably İpek Film, a daughter company of the İpek Merchandise, an import company that was advertising in Ottoman literary journals such as Servet-i Fünun as early as the 19th century. Another important company in the early era of Turkish cinema was Kemal Film, a company whose continuous presence as a leading import company has been often overlooked for a few local films it produced during the 1920s. (The founders of Kemal Film bought their first film camera on loan from the Ipek Merchandise). Both companies were the strongest film distributors until the 1950s and the only companies that were financially sound enough to produce films themselves, with low risks for financial failure as they already were in possession of a distribution system and theatre chains that guaranteed a return on investment.

However, the notable developments of these companies must be seen as necessary adaptations to the technological progress of the western film industries whose films they were importing. One example here being the establishment of the Marmara Dubbing Studio in the early 1930s, when the silent era came to an end in the West and sound films became the standard, prompting the import-dependent companies to adjust themselves to the new technological requirements.

The big distributors in Istanbul, led by İpek Film and Kemal Film, gradually expanded their distribution system throughout the rest of the country during the 1930s, leading to the so-called "regional system" (Bölge İşletmeleri), which consisted of seven distribution areas headquartered in the most significant cities in those regions: Istanbul (Marmara Region), İzmir (Aegean Region), Ankara (Middle Anatolian Region), Samsun (Black Sea Region), Adana (Mediterranean Region), Erzurum (East Anatolian Region) and Diyarbakır (South East Anatolian Region). The Regional System became much more important after the 1950s, when local film production dramatically increased and local films surpassed imported films in both ticket sales and revenues. This system became the financial foundation of Yeşilçam (often referred to as "Turkish Hollywood"), which was the heart of Turkish film production between the years 1955–1975. After 1965, a so-called "Combined System" (Kombine Sistem) led by a trust of regional leaders is said to have taken control of almost everything regarding production. A leading figure of the trust was producer Türker İnanoğlu, who is still active in the media business today, now running Ulusal Film, Turkey's largest TV production company.

The first film showing in Turkey was held in the Yıldız Palace, Istanbul in 1896. Public shows by Sigmund Weinberg in the Beyoğlu and Şehzadebaşı districts followed in 1897. Weinberg was already a prominent figure at that time, especially known as a representative of foreign companies such as Pathé, for whom he sold gramophones before getting into the film business. Some sources suggest he was also a photographer, again as a result of being one of the representatives of foreign companies such as Kodak.

The first Turkish movie, Ayastefanos′taki Rus Abidesinin Yıkılışı, a documentary produced by Fuat Uzkınay in 1914, depicted the destruction of a Russian monument erected at the end of the 1877-1878 Russo-Turkish War in Yeşilköy (then known as "San Stefano") following Turkey's entry into World War I. The first thematic Turkish films were The Marriage of Himmet Aga (1916–1918), started by Weinberg and completed by Uzkinay, and The Paw (1917) and The Spy (1917), both by Sedat Simavi. The army-affiliated Central Cinema Directorate, a semi-military national defense society, and the Disabled Veterans Society were the producing organizations of that period.

In 1922, a major documentary film, Independence, the İzmir Victory, was made about the Turkish War of Independence. That same year, the first private movie studio, Kemal Film, commenced operations. From 1923 to 1939, Muhsin Ertugrul was the only active film director in the country. He directed 29 films during this period, generally incorporating adaptions of plays, operettas, fiction and foreign films. The influence of the theater dating back to Uzkinay, Simavi, Ahmet Fehim and Şadi Karagozoglu is very strong in Ertugrul's work.

The years between 1939 and 1950 were a period of transition for Turkish cinema, during which it was greatly influenced by theater as well as by World War II. While there were only two film companies in 1939, the number increased to four between 1946 and 1950. After 1949, Turkish cinema was able to develop as a separate art form, with a more professional caliber of talents.

The Yeşilçam era

Yeşilçam ("Green Pine") is a metonym for the Turkish film industry, similar to Hollywood in the United States. Yeşilçam is named after Yeşilçam Street in the Beyoğlu district of Istanbul where many actors, directors, crew members and studios were based.

Yeşilçam experienced its heyday from the 1950s to the 1970s, when it produced 250 to 350 films annually. Between 1950 and 1966 more than fifty movie directors practiced film arts in Turkey. Ömer Lütfi Akad strongly influenced the period, but Osman Fahir Seden, Atıf Yılmaz, and Memduh Ün made the most films. The film Susuz Yaz (Dry Summer), made by Metin Erksan, won the Golden Bear Award at the Berlin Film Festival in 1964.

The number of cinemagoers and the number of films made constantly increased, especially after 1958. In the 1960s the programs of the theater departments in the Language, History and Geography faculties of Ankara University and Istanbul University included cinema courses, as did the Press and Publications High School of Ankara University. A cinema branch was also established in the Art History Department of the State Fine Arts Academy.

The Union of Turkish Film Producers and the State Film Archives both date from the 1960s. The State Film Archives became the Turkish Film Archives in 1969. During the same period, the Cinema-TV Institute was founded and annexed to the State Academy of Fine Arts. The Turkish State Archives also became part of this organization. In 1962, the Cinema-TV Institute became a department of Mimar Sinan University. Well-known directors of the 1960–1970 period include Metin Erksan, Atıf Yılmaz, Memduh Ün, Halit Refiğ, Duygu Sağıroğlu, Remzi Aydın Jöntürk and Nevzat Pesen. In 1970, the numbers of cinemas and cinemagoers rose spectacularly. In the 2,424 cinemas around the country, films were viewed by a record number of 247 million viewers.

In 1970, approximately 220 films were made and this figure reached 300 in 1972. Turkish cinema gave birth to its legendary stars during this period, notable examples being Kemal Sunal, Kadir İnanır, Türkan Şoray and Şener Şen. After this period, however, the cinema began to lose its audiences, due to nationwide TV broadcasts. After 1970, a new and younger generation of directors emerged, but they had to cope with an increased demand for video films after 1980.

Yeşilçam movies are known for iconic unforgotten songs. Soundtrack songs are still widely successful. Some famous partners of Yeşilçam are Emel Sayın-Tarık Akan, Fatma Girik-Cüneyt Arkın, Türkan Şoray-Kadir İnanır, Gülşen Bubikoğlu-Tarık Akan, Kemal Sunal-Şener Şen-Halit Akçatepe, Adile Naşit-Münir Özkul, Metin Akpınar-Zeki Alasya, Filiz Akın-Ediz Hun, Ayhan Işık-Belgin Doruk. Yeşilçam's actresses featured included Emel Sayın, Adile Naşit, Itır Esen, Filiz Akın, Fatma Girik, Hülya Koçyiğit, Gülşen Bubikoğlu, Türkan Şoray, Belgin Doruk, Hülya Avşar, Oya Aydoğan, Perihan Savaş, Necla Nazır, Çolpan İlhan, Ayşen Gruda, Nevra Serezli, Müjde Ar, Perran Kutman and Yeşilçam actors are Tarık Akan, Şener Şen, Cüneyt Arkın, Göksel Arsoy, Kemal Sunal, Kadir İnanır, Müşfik Kenter, Münir Özkul, Halit Akçatepe, Hulusi Kentmen, Zeki Alasya, Metin Akpınar, Ediz Hun, Kartal Tibet, Ayhan Işık, Sadri Alışık, Zeki Müren, Ekrem Bora, Metin Serezli, Hüseyin Peyda, Ahmet Mekin, Tamer Yiğit, Kenan Pars, Rüştü Asyalı, Kamran Usluer, Erol Taş, Önder Somer, Müjdat Gezen, Salih Güney, Sertan Acar, Yılmaz Güney, Orhan Gencebay.

1970s and 1980s also brought the genre of Turksploitation - low-budget exploitation films that were either remakes of, or used unauthorized footage from popular foreign films (particularly Hollywood movies) and television series.

Yeşilçam suffered due to the spread of television and the widespread political violence at the end of the 1970s. Yeşilçam totally ended after the 1980 Turkish coup d'état. However, Yeşilçam has seen a revival since 2002, having produced critically acclaimed movies such as Uzak (Grand Prix (Cannes Film Festival), 2003), Babam ve Oğlum (My Father and My Son) and Propaganda.

Decline of Yeşilçam and the post-Yeşilçam era

Increased production costs and difficulties in the import of raw materials brought about a decrease in the number of films made in the 1970s, but the quality of films improved. In the early nineties, there were barely two or three movies released per year. During this period, most of the seventies' stars had either moved to TV, or were trying to rebuild the Yeşilçam's former glory. Some of the notable examples of this era are Eşkıya (The Bandit) and Züğürt Ağa (The Agha), both starring Şener Şen. Both movies were critically and commercially acclaimed.

However, the resurgence of Yesilçam didn't truly take place until the release of Vizontele in 2001. The film was directed, written, and starred by Yılmaz Erdoğan, who was already well-known from his long-running sitcom Bir Demet Tiyatro, and his dedication to theatre. The movie starred the cast of his usual plays, most notably Demet Akbağ, Altan Erkekli, and Cem Yılmaz. This movie's huge commercial success (watched by 2.5 million viewers, which earned the movie the most viewed film for its day) brought attention to the industry. A few years later, Cem Yılmaz released his own film, G.O.R.A., which he both wrote and starred in. This, and Vizontele's sequel Vizontele Tuuba, broke Vizonteles records by achieving 3.5 million and 3 million viewers, respectively.

Since then, larger-budgeted films have been produced, including notable examples such as Kurtlar Vadisi: Irak (Valley of the Wolves: Iraq), which was viewed by a record 4 million people, Babam ve Oğlum (My Father and My Son), and Cem Yılmaz's second movie Hokkabaz (The Magician) .

There has been a rise in experimental films in the 2000s. These include the 2005 feature Türev, which was filmed without a prewritten script and even featured candid shots of the actors, and Anlat Istanbul (Istanbul Tales), an ensemble piece divided into five "mini films" that received a strong reception.

"Körler / Jaluziler İçin" is the first internationally awarded Turkish science fiction feature film which is not a comedy, a cult film, a remake or an animation which marks its unique place as a milestone in the history of Turkish cinema. It was written, directed, produced and edited by Ozan Duru Adam. The film invents an innovative, unconventional visual language.

Production numbers also soared in the second half of the 2000s, reaching 40 films in 2007, with the top four box office hits that year claimed by Turkish films, as the film industry became profitable again with improving technical quality corresponding with commercial films' production costs increasing.

In 2015, number of admission per capita was 0.8. Also Sinemia has published a research that Konya has become the city with the most frequent cinema goers.

Legal issues
Although the need for a cinema law has been frequently debated throughout the history of the Turkish Republic, until 1986 no specific law or regulation had been developed. While films have generally been treated as goods subject to laws regarding taxation, content-wise they were controlled by commissions that have been often criticized for being mechanisms of censorship.

In the 1930s, some members of the parliament raised the issue of whether films would have a bad impact on children. This was a popular theme at that time, not just in Turkey, but also in the United States and elsewhere in the world. Later, in the 1960s, a debate around the so-called "Baykam Law" became quite famous for the tension it created amongst the parliamentarians and the stakeholders in the industry. In 1977 and 1978, further discussions for a cinema law have been held, but without any result.

Finally, in 1986, a cinema law, though highly criticised by members of the industry and the cinema intelligentsia of that time, was passed by the parliament and has since been the fundamental legislative document regarding cinema issues in Turkey. The new law aimed to ensure support for those working in cinema and music. A reorganization of the film industry began in 1987 to address problems and assure its development. The Ministry of Culture established the "Professional Union of Owners of Turkish Works of Cinema" the same year.

The "Copyrights and General Directorate of Cinema" was founded in 1989 as well as a "Support Fund for the Cinema and Musical Arts". This fund is used to provide financial support to the film sector.

Rating systems and censorship
One of the most interesting studies on the issue of film censorship in Turkey is Alim Şerif Onaran's Sinematografik Hürriyet (Cinematic Freedom), published in 1968 by the Ministry of Internal Affairs, but written in 1963 and being the first study in Turkey which received a PhD for a topic related to film. This study is still the most important -if not only- study on the film evaluation methods applied in Turkey before the 1950s. Onaran himself being active as a member of the Film Rating Commission in his younger years, was a true expert on the topic, and his research also includes examples of the late Ottoman Period. Ironically, Onaran became one of the most important intellectuals on film in Turkey, owing his wealth of knowledge on early world film history to the years he spent watching the films he was enrolled to evaluate as a committee member.

A very interesting example on the level of absurdity that censorship could reach is mentioned in Çetin Yetkin's book Siyasal Iktidar Sanata Karşı (Political Regime vs Art), published in 1970. It tells the story of a film which was classified as "inappropriate for export" because the Evaluation Committee decided that the film contains "communist propaganda". The film-owner, who applied to the committee for an export certificate, was surprised to see the decision because he mentioned on his application form that his intention was to sell a copy of the film to a distributor in the Soviet Union, the world's leading communist country at that time.

Important figures

Directors

Atıf Yılmaz
Çağan Irmak
Ertem Eğilmez
Faruk Aksoy
Fatih Akın
Ferzan Özpetek
Halit Refiğ
Kartal Tibet
Kutluğ Ataman
Memduh Ün
Metin Erksan
Nejat Saydam
Nesli Çölgeçen
Nuri Bilge Ceylan
Osman Sınav
Ömer Kavur
Reha Erdem
Remzi Aydın Jöntürk
Semih Kaplanoğlu
Sinan Çetin
Şerif Gören
Tunç Başaran
Türker İnanoğlu
Ümit Ünal
Yavuz Özkan
Yavuz Turgul
Yeşim Ustaoğlu
Yılmaz Güney
Zeki Demirkubuz
Zeki Ökten

Scriptwriters

Attilâ İlhan
Bülent Oran
Kemal Tahir
Orhan Kemal
Orhan Pamuk
Ümit Ünal
Yavuz Turgul

Notable films

Classics

Adı Vasfiye
Anayurt Oteli
Ayna
Bir Araya Gelemeyiz
Dokuzuncu Hariciye Koğuşu
Duvar
Gelin
Hababam Sınıfı
Kibar Feyzo
Maden
Muhsin Bey
Piyano Piyano Bacaksız
Selamsız Bandosu
Selvi Boylum, Al Yazmalım
Sevmek Zamanı
Susuz Yaz
Sürü
Süt Kardeşler
Tosun Paşa
Uçurtmayı Vurmasınlar
Umut
Vesikalı Yarim
Yazgı
Yılanların Öcü
Yol
Züğürt Ağa

Modern era films

Anlat İstanbul
Beş Vakit
Bornova Bornova
Eşkıya
Gönül Yarası
İki Genç Kız
İklimler
Kader
Kasaba
Masumiyet
Mayıs Sıkıntısı
Mustafa Hakkında Her Şey
Sıfır Dediğimde
Türev
Uzak
Uzak İhtimal
Zerre
Zenne Dancer
Körler / Jaluziler İçin - For The Blinds

Cult films

Canım Kardeşim
Hababam Sınıfı series
3 Dev Adam
Ayşecik series
Kilink: Soy ve Öldür
Malkoçoğlu series
Nuri Alço movies
Tarkan series
Turist Ömer series
Yıkılmayan Adam

Commercial successes

A.R.O.G
Babam ve Oğlum
Beyaz Melek
Beynelmilel
Beyza'nın Kadınları
Five Minarets in New York
Fetih 1453
G.O.R.A.
Hokkabaz
I Saw the Sun
Recep İvedik
Karpuz Kabuğundan Gemiler Yapmak
Kurtlar Vadisi: Irak
Miracle in Cell No. 7
Mustang
Organize İşler
Sınav
Vizontele
Çakallarla Dans
Çakallarla Dans 2: Hastasıyız Dede
Kaybedenler Kulübü
Düğün Dernek

indie films

Time to Love
Umut
Gemide
Cogunluk
Toll Booth (film)
Zer
Sivas

Short films
Last years's short films indicates the Turkish Cinema's future style and its new director generation. There are countless number of Turkish short films received awards both in 
national and international festivals. Here are some of it:
-Kefaret (2016), directed by Ali Kışlar
-Kronos (2019) 
-Lütfi (2016), directed by Cahit Kaya Demir 
-Balık (2019), directed by Ercan Bayraktar 
-Mother Mariam (2020), directed by Mustafa Gürbüz 
-Story of a Job Interview (2017), directed by Alkım Özmen http://www.kameraarkasi.org/yonetmenler/kisafilmler/birisgorusmesihikayesi.html
-Suclular / The Criminals (2020), directed by Serhat Karaaslan 

Old Turkish actors and actresses

 Ali Şen
 Adile Naşit
 Ahmet Mekin
 Ajda Pekkan
 Aliye Rona
 Ayhan Işık
 Ayla Algan
 Ayşen Gruda
 Aytaç Arman
 Ayten Gökçer 
 Bedia Muvahhit
 Belgin Doruk
 Bülent Ersoy
 Cahide Sonku
 Cüneyt Arkın
 Cüneyt Gökçer 
 Çolpan İlhan
 Ediz Hun
 Ekrem Bora
 Emel Sayın
 Erdal Özyağcılar
 Erol Evgin
 Erol Günaydın
 Erol Taş
 Eşref Kolçak
 Fatma Girik
 Ferdi Tayfur
 Fikret Hakan
 Filiz Akın
 Gazanfer Özcan
 Göksel Arsoy
 Gönül Yazar
 Gülşen Bubikoğlu
 Hale Soygazi
 Halil Ergün
 Halit Akçatepe
 Hulusi Kentmen
 Hülya Avşar
 Hülya Koçyiğit
 Hüseyin Peyda
 Itır Esen
 İbrahim Tatlıses
 İzzet Günay
 Kadir İnanır
 Kadir Savun
 Kamran Usluer
 Kartal Tibet
 Kemal Sunal
 Kenan Kalav
 Kenan Pars
 Kerem Yılmazer
 Leman Çıdamlı
 Leyla Sayar
 Metin Akpınar
 Metin Serezli
 Muhterem Nur
 Muzaffer Tema
 Müjdat Gezen
 Müjde Ar
 Münir Özkul
 Müşfik Kenter
 Nebahat Çehre
 Necla Nazır
 Nevra Serezli
 Nubar Terziyan
 Nur Sürer
 Orhan Gencebay
 Oya Aydoğan
 Önder Somer
 Öztürk Serengil
 Perihan Savaş
 Perran Kutman
 Rüştü Asyalı
 Sadri Alışık
 Salih Güney
 Selda Alkor
 Sertan Acar
 Şener Şen
 Şevket Altuğ
 Tarık Akan
 Tamer Yiğit
 Tuncel Kurtiz
 Türkan Şoray
 Yıldız Kenter
 Yılmaz Güney
 Zeki Alasya
 Zeki Müren
 Zeynep Değirmencioğlu

List of Turkish films

Major events

Festivals
Adana Film Festival - Another important film festival held annually in the city of Adana. Its top award is the Golden Boll received in the past by such prominent figures as Yılmaz Güney, who himself grew up in Adana.
Ankara Flying Broom Women's Film Festival - (Flying Broom) is Turkey's only festival devoted to Feminism and Gender-Issues. The festival is held on an annual basis in Ankara. The festival aims to support young women in making their debut-films and organizes workshops on scriptwriting and film-making.
International Antalya Golden Orange Film Festival - The most prestigious and popular festival in Turkey. Each year participants are rewarded with the Golden Orange for outstanding performances in categories such as best film, best director, and best actor/actress.
Istanbul International Film Festival - First held in 1982, this annual film festival is one of the most important intellectual events in Turkey, often causing many cineastes living outside of Istanbul to go there for vacation to see the most precious examples of world film history presented there.

Major international awards
Golden Bear in 14th Berlin International Film Festival: Dry Summer
Golden Leopard in 1979 Locarno International Film Festival: The Herd
Jury Grand Prix in 33rd Berlin International Film Festival: A Season in Hakkari
Palme d'Or in 1982 Cannes Film Festival: Yol
Golden Goblet Award for Best Feature Film in 1999 Shanghai International Film Festival: Propaganda
Grand Prix in 2003 Cannes Film Festival: Uzak
Golden Bear in 54th Berlin International Film Festival: Head-On
Golden Shell in 2008 San Sebastián International Film Festival: Pandora's Box
Golden Bear in 60th Berlin International Film Festival: Honey
Grand Prix in 2011 Cannes Film Festival: Once Upon a Time in Anatolia
Golden Goblet Award for Best Feature Film in 2011 Shanghai International Film Festival: Hayde Bre
Grand Prix des Amériques in 2012 Montreal World Film Festival: Where the Fire Burns
Golden George in 2013 Moscow International Film Festival: Particle
Palme d'Or in 2014 Cannes Film Festival: Winter Sleep
Special Jury Prize in 71st Venice International Film Festival: Sivas

Cinema-related organizations

Film schools
Akdeniz University Faculty of Communication, Radio-TV-Cinema Department, Antalya
Anadolu University Cinema and Television Department, Eskişehir
Ankara University Faculty of Communication, Department of Radio, Television and Film, Ankara
Bahçeşehir University Faculty of Communication, Department of Film and Television, İstanbul
Beykent University Faculty of Fine Arts, Department of Cinema and TV, Istanbul
Bilkent University Communication and Design Department, Ankara
Çanakkale Onsekiz Mart University Faculty of Fine Arts, Department of Cinema and Television, Çanakkale
Dokuz Eylül University Faculty of Fine Arts, Department of Film Design, İzmir
Ege University Radio-TV-Cinema Department, İzmir
Galatasaray University Faculty of Communication, Radio-TV-Cinema Department, İstanbul
Hacettepe University Faculty of Communication, Department of Radio-Television and Cinema, Ankara
Istanbul Bilgi University Faculty of Communication, Film&TV Department, Istanbul
Istanbul Medipol University Faculty of Communication, Radio-TV-Cinema Department, Istanbul
Istanbul University Faculty of Communications, Department of Radio-Television and Cinema, Istanbul
İzmir University of Economics Cinema and Digital Media Department, İzmir
Kadir Has University Radio-TV-Cinema Department, İstanbul
Marmara University Faculty of Fine Arts, Department of Film Design, Istanbul
Mimar Sinan Fine Arts University Faculty of Fine Arts, Department of Cinema and Television, Istanbul
Yeditepe University Faculty of Communication, Radio-TV, Cinema Studies, Istanbul

Unions, foundations, professional organisations

 Turkish Film Commissions ( Association of Turkish Film Commissions )
FILM YON — Film Directors' Union
FIYAB — Film Producers' Professional Association 
Istanbul Chamber of Commerce, Film Makers' Professional Committee of Film Producers, Importers, Cinema Owners and Video Distributors.
SESAM — Professional Union of Film Producers, Importers, Cinema-owners
SINE-SEN — Turkey Cinema Worker's Union
SODER — Cinema Actors' Association
ASSOCIATION OF FILM COMMISSIONS
Mardin Film Office - is a not-to-profit organization aims to promote Mardin locally and internationally as a filming location and to contribute development of sustainable cinema culture in Mardin.

See also

 Yanaki and Milton Manaki
 Turkish television drama
 World cinema

References

External links
 Source for further information on Turkish movies and artists
 SinemaTurk A database of Turkish films, TV series and artists.

Further reading
 Savaş Arslan: Cinema in Turkey: A New Critical History, Oxford University Press, 2011, 
 Gönül Dönmez-Colin: Turkish Cinema: Identity, Distance and Belonging, Reaktion Books, 2008, 
 Ekkehard Ellinger ; Kerem Kayi: Turkish cinema 1970–2007 : a bibliography and analysis'', Frankfurt am Main [etc.]: Peter Lang, 2008,